This is a list of characters that appear in the Japanese anime series Ergo Proxy.

Main characters

 

She is also the granddaughter of Donov Mayer, the Regent of Romdeau. Given her privileged status, she demands respect from those around her (in the Japanese dub, she addresses Vincent as "o-mae"). Re-l eventually accompanies Vincent on his journey in order to learn more about the mysterious Proxies and why she feels so drawn to them. Re-l's signature appearance consists of dark clothes, black hair and blue eye-shadow.
 

In the first few episodes, Vincent's eyes remain closed, his hair is slicked down with a large cowlick, and he appears short and "dumpy." However, as the series progresses, he opens his bright green eyes more, stops styling his hair, and carries himself with more confidence and seriousness. He is originally driven to become a Model Citizen, but ultimately fails to suppress the burden of his traumatic past and flees from Romdeau. He has a romantic interest in Re-l Mayer.
 

An infected Companion Type AutoReiv with the mind and body of a child. Pino was originally owned by Raul Creed and his wife, Samantha, whom Pino served as a surrogate child; she is shown to be musically talented as she was once seen playing the piano. It's implied that Raul-(who also plays the piano taught her how to play when she was still living with him and his wife Samantha or simply learned on her own from watching him). She was scheduled for decommissioning after the Creeds were granted a real baby son by the government, but the untimely deaths of Samantha and their infant son at the hands of Monad Proxy leaves Pino infected with the Cogito Virus. She becomes very attached to Vincent early in the series and accompanies him on his journey after running away from home. Pino possesses long purple hair-(which was briefly an ochre brown color in the first two episodes while wearing a long black dress), green eyes, a child-like physique and often wears a pink rabbit costume, which is significant as her role as the 'white rabbit' character in the series; when not wearing her costume, she wears a dark green jumpsuit. She is commonly seen playing a melodica. In the Japanese dub, Pino often refers to herself in the third person and refers to Re-l as "Re-l Re-l."

Recurring characters
 

An Entourage AutoReiv belonging to Re-l Mayer-(having been at her side since she was a child), Iggy contracted a "weaponized" version of the Cogito Virus and grew to become enraged at Re-l's lack of regard for him. He despises Proxies and blames Vincent for taking Re-l - his sole Raison d'Être - away from him.  He develops an unusual state of both loving (because she is his master and raison d'être) and hating (because she is selfish and arrogant) Re-l, and locks her up to "protect" her, while he attempts to kill Vincent. Re-l escapes after being attacked by an AutoReiv belonging to a Proxy she killed, and the AutoReiv pursues her. The AutoReiv goes into a self-detonation mode, and Iggy sacrifices himself to protect Re-l, leaving little more than his broken head behind (which leaves Iggy conscious to some extent). In the end, not wanting to see Iggy suffer due to the virus, Re-l shoots him and buries his head.

 

He and his wife Samantha took Pino as a surrogate child prior to the beginning of the series. Initially loyal to the system, he comes to despise the ruling order responsible for the city's slow decay and lashes out destructively. His mentality also slowly degenerates, as he frequently has hallucinations of a smirking Vincent Law close by. He is quite skilled and accurate with a pistol (as shown in the beginning scenes of episode 17). He eventually ends up wounded when "Real" Mayer, a clone of the original Re-l, attacks him. Finally seeing the damage and feeling the guilt that his actions have caused, he returns home to his now dilapidated mansion where he comes across some drawings that Pino had created depicting herself, Re-l, and Vincent, including one particular drawing depicting Pino and Raul at the mall together; afterwards Raul goes searching for Pino, his only surviving loved one-(intending to take her back into his care), but during his search he is later knocked aside by an infected armed AutoReiv and falls onto a large shard of glass, implaling him through his abdomen. He eventually dies from his wound and is found by his Entourage, Kristeva.

 

Raul Creed's Entourage AutoReiv, Kristeva carries out her duties to Raul loyally. She later takes up the role of being Pino's guardian, per Raul's request. It is strongly implied at the end of the series that she is infected with the Cogito Virus, though her new raison d'être, Pino, allows her to keep her sanity.

 

Daedalus displays a strange obsession for Re-l Mayer. He has two Entourages, Deleuze and Guattari. In the final episodes, Daedalus has been revealed to have created a fake Re-l (named "Real" Mayer) from Monad Proxy's Amrita Cells as a replacement for the original Re-l and eventually gives her wings. Now mentally unstable, he no longer cares what happens to the world. The fake Re-l is taken over by Monad Proxy and leaves. Daedalus, concluding that Re-l has always left him behind, is crushed to death by falling rubble. He survives long enough to witness his clone Re-l be incinerated by sunlight. He is named after Daedalus, a figure from Greek mythology and father of Icarus.

 
Berkeley: 
: 
Husserl: 
Lacan: 
The elderly debilitated  (also ) of Romdo City. These AutoReivs appear as Michelangelo's statues from the Medici Chapel, two resting on either side of Donov's chamber. Donov is Re-l's grandfather. He is murdered in Episode 21 by Proxy One, and his Entourage presumably perishes when his house collapses.

Other characters

Romdeau Dome City
 

Vincent's Entourage AutoReiv. She is killed in Episode 3 by attacking AutoReivs.
Petro Seller

Vincent's boss. He dies in the final episodes. He bears a bizarre resemblance to Adolf Hitler.
Cage Seal

Re-l's boss.
Samantha Ross

Raul Creed's wife. She is accidentally killed by Monad Proxy during her chase after Vincent along with her newborn child.

The Commune
 

The self-appointed leader of the Commune and a compulsive liar. He is intent on getting all the outcasts of Romdo back into the city. He is executed by drones upon arriving at Romdo Dome Bay in Re-l's AHT. (episode 6)
 

A woman who lives in the Commune. Some consider her weird. She has a son, Timothy, who is killed. Though she manages to hold off the drone onslaught, she suffers a fatal wound during the firefight and dies in episode 6.
 

Quinn's son and a friend of Pino. Shot through the head by a drone in episode 5.
The Three Villagers

A trio of aged villagers. One is a middle-aged man, another an aged man with grey-brown hair, and an old woman wearing a hat. The old woman is shot dead by aquatic drones, her hat remaining. The men survive but die in the wasteland, buried by Vincent.

Proxies
 (from a word meaning "one who acts for another") is the name for 300 dark-skinned humanoid beings with near-godlike powers created by the original humans thousands of years prior to the start of the series to watch over the ruined Earth. Each Proxy is the overseer of a dome city and has total control over it. By design, direct sunlight is fatal to Proxies, since they would become obsolete once the planet healed and the original humans returned. Proxies are otherwise incredibly resilient and immortal thanks to "Amrita Cells." It is also implied that a dome city will suffer and eventually die off if it does not have a Proxy watching over it.

Proxy One

The main antagonist of the series, he is Ergo Proxy's original and true self, and calls Vincent his shadow. He was first alluded to in episode 15 and is the one behind the events of the entire series, having created Vincent and then sent him back to Romdo from Mosk to start his revenge plan. Near the end of the series, Proxy One is revealed to be the one who fired the thermonuclear missile Rapture, destroyed Amnesia to hide Vincent's memories, and killed Donov Mayer. He is killed by a combination of Vincent's attacks and sunlight. In spite of his demise he arguably achieves his ultimate goal and leaves Vincent as a legacy who survives the sunlight going against the "creator's" original plans.
Ergo Proxy (Vincent Law)

Agent of Death; Creator and Supervisor of Romdeau Dome and the series' titular character. Ergo Proxy is a "clone" of Proxy One, Romdo's creator and guardian, who was created to help bring about the destruction of the human race because of Proxy One's anger at humanity's treatment of and plans for the Proxies, specifically Monad Proxy. Ergo Proxy often wears a white mask with elements of both The Phantom of the Opera and a harlequin jester to differentiate from Proxy One. Vincent initially has no control over his transformations, changing into Ergo Proxy whenever another Proxy reveals itself, but is implied to be in control of his abilities by the end of the series.
Monad Proxy

Agent of Birth; Creator and Supervisor of Mosk Dome; Proxy Thirteen.  Entrusted with the memories of Ergo Proxy. Killed by Ergo Proxy early in the series, but is reborn in Daedalus Yumena's Re-l clone, "Real" Mayer, possessing white hair and golden eyes like her original body's. Has the ability to sprout wings from her back like an angel. Willingly flies into direct sunlight (fatal to Proxies) after saying goodbye to Vincent, mirroring the story of Icarus. Her original body is implied to have been tampered with by Romdo's scientists when she was captured, evidenced by the patchwork patterns on her body and the heavy metal collar with a vial of unknown liquid attached to her neck.
Kazkis Proxy (Kazkis Hauer)

Agent of Sunlight; Creator and Supervisor of Asura Dome. In his human form, he's an alcoholic with a predilection for red wine (though as a Proxy, he cannot become inebriated). He and Senex Proxy built opposing towers in their respective, connected cities and had hoped to eventually unite. With these plans foiled by her death, he sees Vincent as her replacement but becomes enraged when he realizes that the latter has no recollection of his past. In the ensuing battle, he forces Vincent to come to terms with his true nature as a Proxy, but is mortally wounded in the process. He chooses to perish in the fire he created and spiritually reunites with Senex.
Senex Proxy
 Agent of Moonlight; Creator and Supervisor of Halos Dome. She takes the shape of a female and has feeler-like strips that extend from her head. These are used as her primary means of attack via skewering. She is defeated by Ergo Proxy in episode 8.
"Swan"

A mysterious Proxy who invades Vincent's dreams. Her motives are unclear. It is implied that "Swan" may actually be Monad Proxy reaching out to Vincent.
Will B. Good

Proxy and creator of all the characters in Smile Land. He resembles Walt Disney, with Smile Land resembling Disneyland and its characters being drawn in early Disney style.
Unknown Proxies
Two Proxies appear in the series but are never named. A large Proxy that lived in the wilderness with an AutoReiv, their home appeared to be the ruins of an artificial womb system, so there may have been a city there at one point. This Proxy is killed by Re-l when she shot it using the special bullets designed to kill Proxies. The other is a proxy whose true form is never seen. It lived in a dome where it had killed all the inhabitants for not accepting it. This Proxy had the ability to assume the form of other humans and proxies, copying Vincent and Re-l, but not Pino, as she was an AutoReiv. Vincent killed this Proxy in the lake at the center of the dome.

Halos Dome City
Commander Patecatl

Seen in episode 8, he is the leader of the human survivors of Halos Dome City, who are trying to protect their city's artificial birthing system from the invading AutoReivs. He takes Vincent and Pino in, enlists Vincent's help in their war efforts, and decides to convert the Rabbit into a battle ship. He and his lieutenant later imprison Pino and Vincent when two soldiers are inexplicably killed. Realizing their inevitable defeat, he deserts his forces during the final attack but is killed by Senex Proxy before he can escape on the chopper.
Lieutenant Omacatl

Commander Patecatl's second in command. He's later stabbed through his skull and slaughtered to death by Senex Proxy after his fellow commander attempts to abandon the troupe and escape on a helicopter.
Mayahuel

A crazed prisoner in the cell next to Vincent and Pino, she is obsessed with the "Master of the Moon" (who is later revealed to be Senex Proxy). She is skewered by debris when the chopper brought down by Senex crashes on to her. Although dying, she narrates the ensuing battle between Ergo and Senex and draws her last breath moments after Senex's defeat.

The Game Show
MCQ

Host of the show. Revealed as a proxy upon his death in the end of episode 15.
AD

Mosk Dome City
Amnesia

An AutoReiv that was entrusted to be the Memory Guardian for Ergo Proxy. Amnesia was entrusted with Ergo Proxy's intentionally lost memories back in an underground layer in Mosk that was only accessible by using a Proxy pendant. However, Proxy One had entered the area before Vincent had and destroyed Amnesia to ensure that no memories are obtained by Vincent (as all of them revealed his true nature as a part of Proxy One). He is last seen broken on his chair with a Proxy pendant (marked with the Roman Numeral I as opposed to Vincent's XIII) attached to his neck, repeating the phrase "That which is divided, must become one". His final words hinted at them to return to Romdeau.

Smile Land
Will B. Good

The creator of all the characters in Smile Land. His conversation with Pino reveals himself as a proxy governing Smile Land.
Al

A goofy and dopey yellow bear who befriends Pino in Smile Land. He bears a similar resemblance to Winnie the Pooh, albeit with a top hat, a green polo shirt and a red bow tie; his character is based on Harlequin of the Commedia dell'arte.
Pull

A light green cat who wears punk rock-style clothing-(also wearing a nose piercing) and one of the Entertainment AutoReivs who befriends Pino in Smile Land along with Al and Rogi; his character is based on Pulcinella of the Commedia dell'arte. He also possesses a human form that bears a striking resemblance to Ryuji Sakamoto. After befriending Pino, they call themselves the NaKaMa-(also called "The Three Amigos" in the English dub version). Their group name was inspired by The Three Caballeros.
Rogi

Rogi is a blue cricket create by Will B. Good in order to extract any weaknesses in an indirect way about Vincent for their upcoming fight. His character was inspired by Jiminy Cricket.
Officer Woof

Officer Meow

References

Ergo Proxy